This is a list of areas in Wolverhampton, England (both the city and the borough).

 Aldersley
 All Saints
 Ashmore Park
 Bilston
 Blakenhall
 Bradley, West Midlands
 Bradmore
 Bunker's Hill
 Bushbury
 Castlecroft
 Chapel Ash
 Claregate
 Compton
 Deansfield
 Deepfields
 Dovecotes, Wolverhampton
 Dunstall Hill
 East Park, Wolverhampton
 Ettingshall
 Ettingshall Park
 Fallings Park
 Finchfield
 Fordhouses
 Goldthorn Fields
 Goldthorn Park
 Gorsebrook
 Graiseley
 Green Lanes
 Hall Green
 Heath Town
 Horseley Fields
 Lanesfield
 Low Hill
 Lower Bradley
 The Lunt
 Merridale
 Merry Hill
 Monmore Green
 Moseley, Wolverhampton
 Neachell
 Newbolds
 Newbridge
 New Cross
 Northycote
 Oakfield
 Old Fallings
 Oxley
 Palmer's Cross
 Park Dale
 Parkfields
 Park Village
 Pendeford
 Penn Fields
 Penn
 Perton
 Portobello
 Priestfield
 Scotlands
 Sedgley
 Springfield
 Spring Hill
 Spring Vale
 Stockwell End
 Stow Heath
 Stowlawn
 Tettenhall
 Tettenhall Wood
 The Lunt
 Trysull
 Warstones
 Wednesfield
 Whitmore Reans
 Wightwick
 Wolverhampton
 Wood End
 Wood Hayes
 Woodcross

Wolverhampton
Wolverhampton
Wolverhampton